George Hastings, 4th Earl of Huntingdon (1540 – 30 December 1604) was an English nobleman.

He was a son of Francis Hastings, 2nd Earl of Huntingdon and Catherine Pole, daughter of Henry Pole, 1st Baron Montagu and Jane Neville. He was a younger brother of Henry Hastings, 3rd Earl of Huntingdon, and older brother of Francis Hastings. He succeeded Henry as the 4th Earl.

He was High Sheriff of Leicestershire in 1571 and knight of the shire (MP) for Derbyshire in 1562 and Leicestershire in 1584–1587. He was invested as a knight in 1565. They lived at Gopsall and then Loughborough, both in Leicestershire.

He hosted Anne of Denmark and her children Prince Henry and Princess Elizabeth at Ashby-de-la-Zouch on 22 June 1603. Huntingdon was anxious for the queen to visit and enlisted the Earl of Shrewsbury's steward Richard Bainbrigg and others to make his case that the royal party should come to Ashby Castle from Wollaton Hall.

He was succeeded by his grandson Henry Hastings, 5th Earl of Huntingdon.

He died in 1604.

Marriage
George married Dorothy Port, daughter and co-heiress of Sir John Port of Etwall, Derbyshire. They had five children:
Francis Hastings, Baron Hastings (1560–1595), who was father to Henry Hastings, 5th Earl of Huntingdon.
Henry Hastings (1562 – 5 October 1650).
Sir Edward Hastings.
Catherine Hastings. Married first Sir Walter Chetwynd and secondly Sir Edward Unton. Her second husband was a son of Edward Unton and Anne Seymour. Anne was a daughter of Edward Seymour, 1st Duke of Somerset, and Anne Stanhope.
Dorothy Hastings, was a Maid of Honour at court. She married a Scottish courtier, James Stewart, a son of Walter Stewart of Blantyre. Her second husband was Robert Dillon, 2nd Earl of Roscommon.

References

History of Parliament HASTINGS, Sir George (c.1540–1604) of Etwall, Derbys, Gopsall, Leics and Loughborough, Leics

|-

|-

|-

1540 births
1604 deaths
Lord-Lieutenants of Leicestershire
Lord-Lieutenants of Rutland
Members of the Parliament of England for Leicestershire
George Hastings, 4th Earl of Huntingdon
High Sheriffs of Leicestershire
English MPs 1563–1567
English MPs 1584–1585
English MPs 1586–1587
16th-century English nobility
4
People from Hinckley and Bosworth (district)
People from Loughborough
Barons Hastings
Barons Botreaux
Barons Hungerford